Richters may refer to:
 Christine Richters (born 1966), an American model and Playboy Playmate of 1986
 Ferdinand Richters (1849–1914), a German zoologist
 Grigorij Richters (born 1987), a director, activist and producer
 Ken Richters (born 1955), an American stage actor, playwright and voice actor